Ángel Morales Cuerva (born 13 July 1975 in Barcelona, Spain) is a Spanish retired footballer who played as a defensive midfielder.

External links

Espanyol archives 

1975 births
Living people
Footballers from Barcelona
Spanish footballers
Association football midfielders
La Liga players
Segunda División players
Segunda División B players
CF Montañesa players
UDA Gramenet footballers
RCD Espanyol B footballers
RCD Espanyol footballers
Hércules CF players
Deportivo Alavés players
Gimnàstic de Tarragona footballers
Granada CF footballers
Catalonia international footballers